An orphan is one who has lost both parents.

Orphan(s) or The Orphan(s) may also refer to:

Arts and entertainment

Film and television
 The Orphan (film), a 1960 Hong Kong film starring Bruce Lee
 Orphan (2009 film), a psychological thriller film directed by Jaume Collet-Serra
 Orphan (2016 film), a French film
 Orphans (1987 film), an American film by Alan J. Pakula, based on the play by Lyle Kessler (see below)
 Orphans (1998 film), a Scottish film by Peter Mullan
 "The Orphan" (Alias), a television episode
 Orphan film, a film abandoned by its owner or copyright holder, or any film that has suffered neglect

Literature
 The Orphans series, a 1998 novel series attributed to V. C. Andrews, by Andrew Neiderman
 Orphan (Marvel Comics), a character in the X-Statix series

Music

Albums
 Orphan (Darwin's Waiting Room album), 2001
 Orphan (Empires album) or the title song, 2014
 Orphans: Brawlers, Bawlers & Bastards, by Tom Waits, 2006
 The Orphans, by Kristeen Young, 2006
 Orphans (EP), by Charlotte Martin, 2008

Songs
 "Orphans" (Coldplay song), 2019
 Orphans (Beck song), 2008
 "Orphan", by Silent Planet from Everything Was Sound, 2016
 "Orphan", by Slipknot from We Are Not Your Kind, 2019
 "Orphan", by Toto from Toto XIV, 2015
 "The Orphan", a composition by Modest Mussorgsky, 1971

Theatre
 The Orphan (play), a 1680 play by Thomas Otway
 Orphans (Lyle Kessler play), a 1983 play by Lyle Kessler
 Orphans (Dennis Kelly play), a 2009 play by Dennis Kelly

Science and technology
 Orphan disease, a rare disease
 Orphan drug, one developed under the 1983 U.S. Orphan Drug Act for orphan diseases
 Orphan process, a computer process whose parent process has finished
 Orphan receptor, apparent receptor that has a similar structure to other identified receptors but whose endogenous ligand has not yet been identified
 Orphan source, a self-contained radioactive source that is no longer under proper regulatory control
 Orphaned technology, technology that has been abandoned by its original developers

Other uses
 Orphan (car), any marque of motor vehicle built by a manufacturer that has discontinued business entirely
 Orphan (typesetting), the first line of a paragraph appearing at the bottom of a page
 Orphan works, copyrighted works whose holder is hard to find
 Les Orphan (1923–1995), Welsh footballer
 Sirotci or Orphans, a regional faction of Hussites